Chionogenes drosochlora is a moth of the  family Yponomeutidae. It is found in Australia.

External links
Australian Faunal Directory

Yponomeutidae
Moths described in 1907